Dmitri Ivanovich Kachenovsky (Russian: Дмитрий Иванович Каченовский; 1 January 1827 – 21 December 1872) was a famous Russian jurist.

He taught law at the University of Kharkiv, where he was extremely influential on Maksim Kovalevsky and other liberal political figures.  He is known for being one of the first international lawyers to call for the codification of international law, leading to the Paris Declaration of 1856.

See also
List of Russian legal historians

References
 See "M.M. Kovalevsky" 1 Russian Review 259–268 (available at Google books)(discussing Kachenovsky's influence on Kovalevsky)

Russian legal scholars
International law scholars
National University of Kharkiv alumni
1827 births
1872 deaths